The 1967 Sam Houston State Bearkats football team represented Sam Houston State College (now known as Sam Houston State University) as a member of the Lone Star Conference (LSC) during the 1967 NAIA football season. Led by 16th-year head coach Paul Pierce, the Bearkats compiled an overall record of 3–6 with a mark of 1–6 in conference play, and finished seventh in the LSC.

Schedule

References

Sam Houston State
Sam Houston Bearkats football seasons
Sam Houston State Bearkats football